Murder at the World Series is a 1977 American TV movie starring Lynda Day George, Murray Hamilton, and Karen Valentine and directed by Andrew V. McLaglen.

Plot
A psychopath, once rejected for membership of the Houston Astros, plans revenge by staging a series of kidnappings while the team plays in the World Series against the Oakland A's.

Cast

 Lynda Day George as Margot Mannering
 Murray Hamilton as Harvey Murkison 
 Karen Valentine as Lois Marshall
 Gerald S. O'Loughlin as Moe Gold
 Michael Parks as Larry Marshall
 Janet Leigh as Karen Weese
 Hugh O'Brian as The Governor
 Nancy Kelly as Alice Dakso
 Johnny Seven as Detective Severino
 Tamara Dobson as Lisa 
 Joseph Wiseman as Sam Druckman
 Bruce Boxleitner as Cisco
 Larry Mahan as Gary Vawn
 Cooper Huckabee as Frank Gresham
 Lisa Hartman as Stewardess
 Maggie Wellman as Kathy
 Cynthia Avila as Jane Torres
 Monica Gayle as Barbara Gresham
 Dick Enberg as Radio Announcer

References

External links

The movie was about a planned murder at a ‘fictional’ World Series between the Houston Astros & the Oakland Athletics... (I played Sal Bando, the 3rd Baseman for the A’s) - also, players from the Houston Karl Young College (summer) League were used as other Athletics’ players... (Real ‘Houston Astros players’ were used in the making of this movie, as well)

1977 films
1977 television films
1970s sports films
1970s thriller films
1970s English-language films
ABC network original films
American baseball films
Films set in Houston
Films shot in Houston
Houston Astros
Films directed by Andrew McLaglen
American thriller television films
1970s American films